Grevillea cunninghamii is a species of flowering plant in the family Proteaceae and is endemic to the north of Western Australia. It is a shrub with egg-shaped leaves with sharply-pointed teeth on the edges, and clusters of red flowers.

Description
The flowers are red and pale red to yellow with a red style.

Taxonomy
Grevillea cunninghamii was first formally described in 1830 by Robert Brown in the Supplementum primum prodromi florae Novae Hollandiae from specimens collected by Allan Cunningham in 1820. The specific epithet (cunninghamii) honours the collector of the type specimens.

Distribution and habitat
Grevillea cunninghamii usually grows in open scrub communities in near-coastal regions and off-shore islands between Cape Londonderry and King Sound in the Dampierland, Northern Kimberley and Victoria Bonaparte biogeographic regions of northern Western Australia.

Conservation status
This grevillea is listed as "not threatened" by the Department of Biodiversity, Conservation and Attractions.

References

Eudicots of Western Australia
cunninghamii
Plants described in 1830
Taxa named by Robert Brown (botanist, born 1773)